La vecina (English title: The Neighbor) is a Mexican comedy-telenovela produced by Lucero Suárez for Televisa. It is the remake of the telenovela La costeña y el cachaco produced in 2003 by RCN TV. In the United States, Univision broadcast La Vecina from June 22, 2015 to March 3, 2016.

Production 
Production of the telenovela began in 2014, but it was not until February that its showing was confirmed.

Plot 
Sara ends a long courtship with Cheo and is fired from the hotel where she worked in Progreso. Faced with this situation, she decides to leave to San Gaspar, a small town, for a few days with her uncle Simón an aeronautical engineer who is devoted to agriculture; and with Bruno who falls for Laura the wife of Pedro the local leader of the plunderers of gasoline.

In CONATROL, company dedicated to the distribution of petroleum; the Director-General, Mr. Uribe decides to send the Eng. Antonio Andrade to the plant in San Gaspar, due to excessive theft of gasoline in the area. Antonio agrees to leave immediately, postponed his wedding with Isabel daughter of millionaire Guillermo Cisneros.

In San Gaspar, father Vicente, uncle of Sara, is the leader of "The winged" local football team whose rival is Fidel, the Commander in Chief of San Gaspar, leader of "The Gunners." Both scramble to take over "jaibolera" the maximum trophy of the local tournament.

Ricardo takes advantage of Antonio's absence in the Federal District to take his place, even to seducing Isabel who is engaged to Antonio, and also allying himself in secret with Pedro to pass confidential information about CONATROL.

The action binds Sara and Antonio first as neighbors and then when it comes to CONATROL to ask for work. Sara and Antonio come together during a weekend on an unexpected journey. A great attraction develops between the two despite their very different personalities.

Cast 
Cast was confirmed on March 14, 2015.

Main cast 
Esmeralda Pimentel as Sara Granados 
Juan Diego Covarrubias as Antonio Andrade

Supporting cast 

Natalia Guerrero as Isabel Cisneros
Alejandro Ibarra as Padre Vicente Granados
Luis Gatica as Pedro Arango
Carlos Bracho as Ing. Juan Carlos Uribe
Arturo Carmona as Fidel Chávez
Pierre Angelo as Simón Esparza
María Alicia Delgado as Marina
Eduardo Shacklett as Anselmo
Javier Jattin as Eliseo "Cheo" González
Violeta Isfel as Titina
Sugey Abrego as Edwina Chávez
Edsa Ramírez as Natalia
José Manuel Lechuga as Sebastián
Adalberto Parra as Eduardo Andrade
Ariane Pellicer as Ema de Andrade
José Montini as Pepe
Ricardo Fernández Rue as Roque
Alfredo Gatica as Ricardo Segura
Fernanda Vizuet as Laura de Arango
Mauricio Abularach as Bruno
Polo Monárrez as Nelson
Bibelot Mansur as  Magdalena de Chávez
Maribel Lancioni as Ligia 
Benjamín Rivero as Rafael
Luis Manuel Ávila as Ing. Gutiérrez
Itza Sodi as Enrique "Kike"
Mercedes Vaughan as Mercedes Esparza de Granados
Rolando Brito as Carmelo Arango
Lenny Zundel as Ing. Ignacio López
Roberto Romano as Elías
Solkin Ruz as Javier
Kevin Holt as David
Alex Otero as Vladimir Chávez
Alexandro as Juancho Granados Esparza
José Luis Badalt as Ramón
Gersón Martínez as Quintín
Mara Matosic as Reportera
Benny Ibarra as Guillermo Cisneros
Ricardo Kleinbaum as Marcelo / Guillermo Alfonso 
Mariana Karr as Lucita
Moisés Muñoz as himself

Soundtrack

The soundtrack is composed and performed by Jorge Domínguez. It was released on July 20, 2015 by Fonarte Latino

Track listing

Mexico broadcast

References

External links 

Televisa telenovelas
Mexican telenovelas
2015 Mexican television series debuts
2015 telenovelas
2016 Mexican television series endings
Mexican television series based on Colombian television series
Mexican LGBT-related television shows
Spanish-language telenovelas